Déjà Vu is a film released in 1985, produced by Cannon Films. The film, an adaptation of the novel Always by Trevor Meldal-Johnsen, is a reincarnation love story, directed by Anthony B. Richmond, and written by Richmond, Ezra D. Rappaport, and Arnold Anthony Schmidt. The film stars Jaclyn Smith, Claire Bloom, Nigel Terry and Shelley Winters.

Cast
 Jaclyn Smith as Brooke 
 Nigel Terry as Michael 
 Shelley Winters as Olga Nabokova
 Claire Bloom as Eleanor Harvey
 Richard Kay as William Tanner  
 Frank Gatliff as William Tanner  
 Michael Ladkin as Willmer
 David Lewin as Reporter
 Marianne Stone as Mabel
 Virginia Guy as Lead Dancer
 David Adams as Chauffeur
 Josephine Buchan as Research Assistant
 Richard Graydon as Captain Wilson
 Claire Bayliss as Dancer
 Elizabeth Cantillon as Dancer
 Robin James as Dancer
 Philippa Luce as Dancer
 Wendy Roe as Dancer

References

External links

1985 films
1980s romance films
Films about reincarnation
British drama films
1985 drama films
Films scored by Pino Donaggio
Golan-Globus films
Films produced by Menahem Golan
Films based on novels
Films produced by Yoram Globus
1985 directorial debut films
1980s English-language films
1980s British films